Men and Women is a lost 1925 American silent drama film produced by Famous Players-Lasky and released by Paramount Pictures. It was directed by William C. deMille and starred Richard Dix, Claire Adams, and Neil Hamilton. It is based on a play, Men and Women, written years earlier by David Belasco and Henry Churchill de Mille, father of the director.

PLOT
Robert Stevens robs the bank where he is employed, and through the efforts of Calvin Stedman, the prosecuting attorney, he is sentenced to six years' imprisonment. While in jail his wife dies and his little daughter, Agnes, is placed in a convent. At the expiration of his sentence, Stevens locates his daughter and settles in Arizona, assuming the name of Stephen Rodman.

Cast
Richard Dix as Will Prescott
Claire Adams as Agnes Prescott
Neil Hamilton as Ned Seabury
Henry Stephenson as Arnold Kirke
Robert Edeson as Israel Cohen
Flora Finch as Kate

Production

Development
A 1914 Biograph film with the same name based on the same play still exists. It was directed by James Kirkwood and starred Lionel Barrymore, Blanche Sweet and her future husband Marshall Neilan.

References

External links

1925 films
American silent feature films
Lost American films
Films directed by William C. deMille
American films based on plays
Paramount Pictures films
1925 drama films
Silent American drama films
American black-and-white films
Remakes of American films
1925 lost films
Lost drama films
1920s American films